Lake Billy Chinook Airport, also known as Lake Billy Chinook State Airport,  is a public use airport located six nautical miles (7 mi, 11 km) west of the central business district of Culver, a city in Jefferson County, Oregon, United States. The airport is privately owned, despite the name which might give the impression that it was owned by the state.

Facilities and aircraft 
Lake Billy Chinook Airport covers an area of 29 acres (12 ha) at an elevation of 2,695 feet (821 m) above mean sea level. It has one runway designated 16/34 with an asphalt surface measuring 2,500 by 32 feet (762 x 10 m).

For the 12-month period ending April 13, 2010, the airport had 560 general aviation aircraft operations, an average of 46 per month. At that time there were 10 aircraft based at this airport: 90% single-engine and 10% multi-engine.

References

External links 
 Aerial image as of July 2000 from USGS The National Map
 

Airports in Jefferson County, Oregon
Privately owned airports